The Eiskar is the only existing glacier in the Carnic Alps. It is a typical cirque glacier that, thanks to its shady location and to avalanche breaks in its catchment area, has been able to survive at the relatively low height of 2160–2390 metres above sea level. Although the ice sheet in good times could calve over a rock wall down to the pasture of Valentinalm below, currently it is rapidly becoming a sheet of dead ice. In the period 2007–2014, however, no significant retreat was observed.
The glacier may be accessed from below up a klettersteig, and from above quite easily via the Kellerwand rock face. Remains of defensive positions witness to the mountain war of 1915-1918.

References

External links 
Glacier report of 2004/05 (pdf file; 792 kB)
Private webpage

Glaciers of Austria
Glaciers of the Alps
Carnic Alps
GEiskar